The Levi Sheard Mill, also known as Sheard's Mill and John S. Clymer Mill, is a historic grist mill located in East Rockhill Township, Bucks County, Pennsylvania. The first section was built about 1825, with three additions built into the early 20th century.  The mill was purchased by Levi Sheard in 1844. In 1916 ownership was transferred to brothers Rubin and John Clymer. The mill continued to operate until the 1970s. A sign placed in front of the mill indicates the importance of the grist mill to the surrounding area. The Sheard's Mill Covered Bridge, also on the National Register of Historic Places list is next to the mill. Currently the property is used as a campground.

It was placed on the National Register of Historic Places on December 18, 2006.

References

Grinding mills on the National Register of Historic Places in Pennsylvania
Industrial buildings completed in 1905
Grinding mills in Bucks County, Pennsylvania
National Register of Historic Places in Bucks County, Pennsylvania
1905 establishments in Pennsylvania